We Will Survive is a 2016 Philippine comedy-drama television series directed by Jeffrey Jeturian and Mervyn Brondial, starring Pokwang and Melai Cantiveros. The series premiered on ABS-CBN and worldwide on The Filipino Channel on February 29, 2016, replacing Pasión de Amor. Starting April 18, 2016, it was demoted to ABS-CBN's Kapamilya Gold afternoon block to give way for My Super D. It airs on Weekdays at 5:00-5:45pm after Tubig at Langis.

Series overview

Episode List

Chapter 1

Chapter 2

References

Lists of Philippine drama television series episodes